Both Sides of the Brain is the fourth solo studio album by American hip hop musician Del the Funky Homosapien. It was released by Hieroglyphics Imperium Recordings in 2000. It peaked at number 118 on the Billboard 200 chart.

Critical reception

Nathan Rabin of The A.V. Club gave the album a mixed review, saying that there is "much to like about the album" but also describing it as "a bit of a letdown". He describes Del's production work as "inventive" but "largely monotonous and unnecessarily repetitive" and adds, "Equally damaging is the album's lack of form and structure: Many of its tracks sound like marathon free-styling sessions no one had the heart to edit."

In 2005, Peter S. Scholtes of City Pages included it on the "Top 100 Albums of the 2000s" list.

Track listing

Charts

References

External links
 

2000 albums
Del the Funky Homosapien albums
Hieroglyphics Imperium Recordings albums
Albums produced by El-P
Albums produced by Prince Paul (producer)